Sylvia Harper (née Lance; 1 October 1895 – 21 October 1982) was an Australia tennis player who won the singles title at the 1924 Australian Championships. She reached the singles final there two other times, in 1927, losing to Esna Boyd, and in 1930, losing to Daphne Akhurst.

Harper won the women's doubles title at the Australian Championships three consecutive years. In 1923, her partner was Boyd, and in 1924 and 1925, her partner was Akhurst. She reached the final an additional three times with three different partners, in 1927, 1929, and 1930.

Harper won the mixed doubles title at the Australian Championships in 1923 with Horace Rice and was the runner-up in that event in 1925.

According to A. Wallis Myers of The Daily Telegraph and the Daily Mail, Harper was ranked World No. 10 in 1924, the only year she was included in those rankings.

Harper competed overseas on two occasions; in 1920 she competed at Wimbledon and, in 1925, captained the first women's tennis team to represent Australia internationally. At Wimbledon, she made the second round of the ladies singles, where she lost to Dorothy Shepherd, the ladies doubles, where she partnered Daphne Akhurst and the mixed doubles, where she partnered E. T. Lamb.

She married businessman Robert Rainy Harper on 28 May 1924 and they had one son.

Grand Slam finals

Singles: 3 (1 title, 2 runners-up)

Doubles: 6 (3 titles, 3 runners-up)

Mixed doubles: 2 (1 title, 1 runner-up)

Grand Slam singles tournament timeline

1Through 1923, the French Championships were open only to French nationals. The World Hard Court Championships (WHCC), actually played on clay in Paris or Brussels, began in 1912 and were open to all nationalities. The results from that tournament are shown here for 1920 through 1923. The Olympics replaced the WHCC in 1924, as the Olympics were held in Paris. Beginning in 1925, the French Championships were open to all nationalities, with the results shown here beginning with that year.

See also 
 Performance timelines for all female tennis players who reached at least one Grand Slam final

References

1895 births
Australasian Championships (tennis) champions
Australian female tennis players
Grand Slam (tennis) champions in women's singles
Grand Slam (tennis) champions in women's doubles
Grand Slam (tennis) champions in mixed doubles
Place of birth missing
1982 deaths